"Love T.K.O." is a song written by Cecil Womack and Gip Noble, Jr. It was written for soul singer David Oliver, and appeared first on his album Here's to You in 1980.

Teddy Pendergrass recording
"Love T.K.O." is mainly associated  with R&B and soul artist Teddy Pendergrass, who recorded the song for his 1980 album TP, releasing it as a single the same year. It reached No. 2 on the Billboard R&B chart and No. 44 on the Billboard Hot 100.

Charts

Teddy Pendergrass version

Regina Belle version
Regina Belle recorded and released her version in 1995 and included on her Reachin' Back LP.

Other recordings
"Love TKO" has been covered by several artists, including:
Deborah Harry
Hall & Oates
Bette Midler
Boz Scaggs
Lambchop
Michael McDonald
Seal
Cecil and Linda Womack recorded the song themselves as Womack & Womack and it appeared simply as "T.K.O." on their debut album Love Wars in 1983.
Fourplay
Modern Man (Pittsburgh R&B/dance/cover band)
Tatsuro Yamashita on his 1999 album On the Street Corner 3

Samples
In 1995, R&B group Xscape sampled it for their remix of "Who Can I Run To". 
In 1996, the song was sampled by Kenny Lattimore on "I Won't Let You Down".
Total as well as featured in the 2015 motion picture Concussion.

Popular culture
In 2006, Pendergrass' version of the song was featured in the popular video game Grand Theft Auto: Vice City Stories on fictional radio station VCFL. 
It was used in 2005 video game Fahrenheit (a.k.a. Indigo Prophecy). 
DJ Spooky referenced the song in his essay titled "Groove Theory" in URB. 
Artist Ahmad Lewis used the melody for a remix of his 1994 song "Back in the Day" from his self-titled album Ahmad.

References

1980 singles
Philadelphia International Records singles
Songs written by Cecil Womack
Teddy Pendergrass songs
1980 songs
Mercury Records singles
Regina Belle songs